Zoellnerallium is a genus of perennial herbaceous geophytes in the flowering plant family Amaryllidaceae. It is native to South America. It is included in the tribe Gilliesieae, within the subfamily Allioideae. It is considered to be part of a group of four genera within Gilliesieae, referred to as Ipheieae nom. nud.. In 2014 it was proposed to create a new tribe Leucocorynae with six genera, including Zoellnerallium, by splitting Gilliesieae into two separate tribes.

References

Bibliography 

 
 

Amaryllidaceae genera
Allioideae